Baheri railway station is a railway station in Bareilly district, Uttar Pradesh. Its code is BHI. It serves Baheri city. The station consists of two platforms. Passenger and Express trains halt here.

Trains 

The following trains halt at Baheri railway station in both directions:

 Bandra Terminus–Ramnagar Express
 Lucknow Junction–Kathgodam Express
 Agra Fort–Ramnagar Weekly Express
 Kanpur Central–Kathgodam Garib Rath Express

References

Izzatnagar railway division
Railway stations in Bareilly district